Upper Keremeos is a ghost town located in the Similkameen region of British Columbia, Canada. The town is situated on the east side of Keremeos Creek, near the village of Keremeos.

References

Ghost towns in British Columbia